The Olde Ship is an historic building in Pilling, Lancashire, England. It was built in 1782 for sea captain and slave trader George Dickinson (1732–1806), and has been designated a Grade II listed building by Historic England.

The building was used as a farmhouse, owned by a Mr Whiteside, in 1815, while William Armer was landlord, when the property was a public house, for 36 years, retiring in 1927 at the age of 68.

The village smithy adjoined the inn. It is now a private residence.

See also
Listed buildings in Pilling

Notes

Sources

External links
A view of the building in 2017
A 19th-century view of the building

1782 establishments in England
Houses completed in 1732
Grade II listed buildings in Lancashire
Houses in Lancashire
Hotels in Lancashire
Pubs in Lancashire
Buildings and structures in the Borough of Wyre